Telmatobius contrerasi is a species of frog in the family Telmatobiidae.
It is endemic to Argentina.
Its natural habitat is rivers.
It is threatened by habitat loss.

References

contrerasi
Endemic fauna of Argentina
Amphibians of Argentina
Amphibians of the Andes
Taxonomy articles created by Polbot
Amphibians described in 1977
Taxa named by José Miguel Alfredo María Cei